Aden Bowman Collegiate is in the Queen Elizabeth subdivision, in Saskatoon, Saskatchewan, serving students from grades 9 through 12. It is also known as Aden Bowman, Bowman, or ABCI. The school was opened on September 2, 1958.

Aden Bowman is known for the IB program and its fine arts program.

Fine arts 
Aden Bowman is home of the Robert Hinitt or 'Castle' Theatre.  The theatre, designed by a former teacher, includes a fly tower, a thrust stage and seating for about 600 people.  Renovations occurred in the late 1990s which improved but altered the look of the original design of the theatre.  A new ceiling was installed over the house, the thrust stage was redesigned and its ability to move under the proscenium stage was removed, a loading gallery for the fly gallery was installed, seating which came from the Capitol Theatre was removed and replaced with new seating, and the lobby was reconfigured. The theatre is rented to many outside groups.  Robert Hinitt died on November 11, 2011, at Oliver Lodge, Saskatoon.

Senior drama productions are held each fall.  They are open to students in grades 11 and 12. Youth theatre and musicals alternate every year. One-acts take place each spring and are directed by senior students.

Hordern Hall, designed by the school's first band director, houses the music facility.  The hall includes a large rehearsal hall, in which none of the walls are at 90 degrees for acoustics. The hall also has four smaller music practice rooms and two larger ensemble rooms. Hordern Hall has easy access to Robert Hinitt Theatre.

Sports 

Aden Bowman's senior football team competes in the Saskatoon League, in the 4A division, which is the highest level of collegiate football in Saskatchewan. The team has played 52 seasons since forming in 1958, and has won eight city championships (1963, 1964, 1965, 1970, 1976, 2007, 2008 and 2009) and three provincial 4A titles (1970, 2007, and 2009). Since the rebirth of its program in the 2004 season, Aden Bowman football has led Saskatoon, with 27 alumni completing at least one season on the roster of either a Canadian Junior Football League or CIS Football roster (up to and including the 2011 season). In this time Aden Bowman has amassed the league's best winning percentage in both regular season (.85) and playoff contests (.80), and has played in six of the last seven city league championships (2004, 2005, 2007, 2008, 2009, 2010).

The Bears' traditional rivals are fellow Taylor Street schools Holy Cross High School and Walter Murray Collegiate.

History 
The name for the school comes from local businessman Aden Bowman, who came to Saskatoon in 1907 at the age of nineteen with no more than a grade nine education. With little knowledge about the field, Bowman purchased a small bicycle repair business on 20th Street. The business was very successful and over the next few years it expanded beyond bicycles to repairing automobiles and motorcycles. Throughout Bowman's success he realized the importance of a strong education, which he shared with his children and grandchildren. Bowman wanted to help the community with his self-made success, so he served as alderman for twelve years and was the chairman of the collegiate board for fourteen years.
 
This was the first collegiate to be named after a person, rather than a program or location of the school.

Currently its feeder schools are Buena Vista School, Chief Whitecap School, Holliston School, Hugh Cairns, V. C. School, John Lake School, Prince Philip School, Queen Elizabeth School and Victoria School.

The school opened in 1958 on September 2.

Weekend education
The Saskatoon Japanese Language School (サスカトーン補習授業校 Sasukatōn Hoshū Jugyō Kō), a weekend Japanese educational program, holds its classes at Aden Bowman Collegiate.

Notable alumni 
 Gayleen Froese, author
 Keith Magnuson, hockey player
 Kevin Mambo, Broadway and screen actor; two-time Emmy winner
 Joni Mitchell, singer, artist
 Krista Phillips, basketball player
 Don Sparrow, illustrator
 Brendan Taman, football executive

References

External links 

 Aden Bowman Collegiate website
 Aden Bowman Collegiate – Saskatoon Public School Division

High schools in Saskatoon
Educational institutions established in 1958
1958 establishments in Saskatchewan